Asterocampa, commonly called hackberry butterflies or American emperors, is a genus of butterflies in the family Nymphalidae found mainly in North and Central America and the Caribbean.

Species 
The celtis species group:
 Asterocampa celtis (Boisduval & Le Conte, 1835) – hackberry emperor
 Asterocampa leilia (Edwards, 1874) – Empress Leilia or desert hackberry

The clyton species group:
 Asterocampa clyton (Boisduval & Le Conte, 1835) – tawny emperor
 Asterocampa idyja (Geyer, 1828) – dusky emperor

External links 
 "Asterocampa Röber, 1916" at Markku Savela's Lepidoptera and Some Other Life Forms

Apaturinae
Nymphalidae genera
Taxa named by Julius Röber